Mathias Tallberg (born 7 March 1960) is a Finnish sailor. He competed in the Star event at the 1980 Summer Olympics.

References

External links
 

1960 births
Living people
Finnish male sailors (sport)
Olympic sailors of Finland
Sailors at the 1980 Summer Olympics – Star
Sportspeople from Helsinki